Björn Bjurling (born 21 August 1979 in Stockholm, Sweden) is a Swedish professional ice hockey goaltender, currently without a contract. He was drafted in the ninth round of the 2004 NHL Entry Draft, 274th overall, by the Edmonton Oilers.

References

External links

1979 births
AIK IF players
Brynäs IF players
Edmonton Oilers draft picks
Djurgårdens IF Hockey players
Living people
Ice hockey people from Stockholm
Södertälje SK players
Swedish expatriate ice hockey people
Swedish expatriate sportspeople in Norway
Swedish ice hockey goaltenders
Vålerenga Ishockey players